Helen Park (born Hyunjung Park, March 23, 1986) is a South Korean-born composer based in New York City. She is a 2018 Lucille Lortel Award Winner and the recipient of the 2018 Richard Rodgers Award. Best known for her score on the musical KPOP, Park was nominated for three Drama Desk Awards.

Biography 
Park was born in Busan, South Korea, and moved to Canada in her third year of middle school. She attended New York University where she received her MFA in Musical Theatre Writing from the Tisch School of the Arts. Park is also an alumna of the BMI Lehman Engel Musical Theatre Workshop.

Work 
Park is a composer-lyricist, music producer and orchestrator for the Broadway-bound musical KPOP. She is also a songwriter for Over the Moon, a Netflix musical animated feature film directed by Glen Keane, which was released on October 23, 2020.

Award & Nominations

See also
 Koreans in New York City

References

External links 

 Official website

Place of birth missing (living people)
American dramatists and playwrights
American women composers
21st-century American composers
Tisch School of the Arts alumni
Living people
South Korean composers
1986 births
21st-century American women